The BMW M6 is a high-performance version of the 6 Series marketed under the BMW M sub-brand from 1983 to 2018 (with a break from 1990 to 2004).

Introduced in the coupe body style, the M6 was also built in convertible and fastback sedan ('Gran Coupe') body styles for later generations. An M6 model was built for each of the first three generations of the 6 Series. Production of the M6 ended in 2018 and it was replaced by the BMW M8 (F91/F92/F93) in 2019.

E24 M635CSi/M6 (1983–1989)

The M6 lineage began in 1983 with the M635CSi model of the E24 6 Series range, which was powered by the M88/3 DOHC straight-six engine (which was a modified version of the engine used in the BMW M1 supercar). In most countries, the model was badged the M635CSi, however the equivalent model in North America and Japan was simply badged in "M6".

The catalyzed engine was also used in European and other market cars beginning in the summer of 1987, with identical specifications to the federalized engine. The sole transmission for all models was a 5-speed Getrag 280 manual transmission.

Other changes included BBS RS wheels, a rear lip spoiler, a larger front air dam, larger front brakes and revised suspension with a  lower ride height.

The E24 series became a "world car" for the 1988 and 1989 model years, sporting the same bumpers and aerodynamic treatments as its high-performance counterparts across all markets. Production of the E24 M635CSi/M6 ended in 1989.

A top speed of  made the European M635CSi the second fastest BMW automobile ever built next to the M1. The quarter mile time for the M635 CSi has been recorded at 14.5 seconds while  is achieved in 15 seconds.

A total of 5,855 cars were produced. Of these, 1,677 cars were imported to North America.

E63/64 M6 (2005–2011)  

Following a hiatus in M6 production for 16 years, the M6 version of the E63/E64 6 Series was introduced in 2005. The M6 uses the same BMW S85 V10 engine and SMG-III automated manual gearbox as the E60 M5.

The M6 was produced as both a coupé (E63 model code) and a convertible (E64 model code). The exterior styling was overseen by Karl Elmitt.

Manufacturer claimed performance included a 0– acceleration time of 4.6 seconds.

The coupe version weighs  and the convertible version weighs . Weight reduction measures include a (coupe-only) carbon fibre roof (a first for regular production model last used on E46 M3 CSL), thermoplastic quarter panels, aluminium doors, aluminium bonnet (hood) and a thermo-fibre plastic boot (trunk) lid.

From 2007 a 6-speed manual gearbox was offered in North America, only 701 examples were produced with a manual gearbox (323 Coupes and 378 Convertibles).

Production of the M6 ended in 2011, with sales over the five-year run totalling 9,087 for the coupe and 5,065 for the convertible.

F06/F12/F13 M6 (2012–2019)  

The new model is based on the F12/F13/F06 6 Series, and shares its 7-speed dual clutch ("M-DCT") transmission and BMW S63 twin-turbo V8 engine with the F10 M5.

The differential is an electronically actuated ("Active M") limited slip differential.

The front of the car has a newly designed M kidney grille with an “M6” badge – a homage to the first generation of the M6. The lead exterior designer of the F12/F13/F06 6 Series was Nader Faghihzadeh.

M Performance Parts can be fitted to all M6 models. These include black kidney grilles, a sport exhaust system that reduces weight, a carbon fibre diffuser, a carbon fibre spoiler, a carbon fibre sport steering wheel and a carbon fibre gear selector.

Competition Package 
This results in a 0 to  acceleration time of 3.9 seconds for the coupe and Gran Coupe versions.

Motorsport

M6 GT3

Around the start of 2015, BMW Motorsport began developing a replacement for the successful BMW Z4 GT3 which already had been in action since 2010, where they selected the M6 as the base model. Throughout the year, the factory engineered the M6 to match FIA GT3 specifications. Emphasis was placed on safety with BMW Motorsport producing an "FIA-approved safety cell in accordance with the very latest safety standards". Unlike the Z4 GT3, which used an engine derived from the BMW M3, the engine of the M6 GT3 was virtually unchanged from that of the production model of the M6 (and the BMW M5). The engine only faced some modifications for use in motorsport. In May 2015, at Dingolfing, BMW works driver Jörg Müller drove the M6 GT3 on its first roll-out to contribute a milestone to its development, and later the M6 GT3 was revealed near the end of the year.

The M6 GT3 showed its success on its debut year in 2016 when Rowe Racing clinched overall victory at the 2016 Spa 24 Hours with BMW works drivers Philipp Eng, Maxime Martin, and Alexander Sims at the wheel. The car also saw success in championships around the world, with wins in the VLN, Italian GT Championship, and Super GT Championship.

M6 GTLM
The BMW M6 GTLM is the racing version of the M6 created to participate in the IMSA WeatherTech SportsCar Championship and intended to replace the BMW Z4 GTE. The cars  are entered by BMW Team RLL, debuting in 2016, with no wins in its debut season. The car would earn four class wins during the 2017 season before being replaced by the BMW M8 GTE for 2018.

See also 
 BMW M5

References

Footnotes 

M6
2000s cars
Cars introduced in 1983
Cars discontinued in 2019